Bridgeport (until 1852, Suckertown) is an unincorporated community in Mariposa County, California.

Originally called Suckertown, Andrew Church opened a store in 1852 and bestowed its current name.

References

Unincorporated communities in California
Unincorporated communities in Mariposa County, California
1852 establishments in California